Uqba bin al-Harith was a companion of Muhammad, but used to be an enemy of him when he was a Pagan. According to the Muslim scholar Safiur Rahman Mubarakpuri, when he was still a Pagan, the Quraysh ordered Khubyab bin Adi to be crucified by Uqba bin al-Harith during the Expedition of Al Raji, because he had killed Uqba bin al-Harith's father.

The killing of Khubyab bin Adi by Uqba bin al-Harith is mentioned in Sahih al-Bukhari as follows:

See also
List of battles of Muhammad

References

Companions of the Prophet
Year of birth unknown
Year of death unknown